Number 99 is a 1920 American silent thriller film directed by Ernest C. Warde and starring J. Warren Kerrigan, Fritzi Brunette and Emmett King.

Synopsis
A man wrongly sent to jail escapes and goes on the run, searching out the real criminal.

Cast
 J. Warren Kerrigan as Arthur Penryn
 Fritzi Brunette as Cynthia Vivian
 Emmett King as Compton Vivian
 Charles Arling as John Brandt
 Kathleen Kirkham as Mrs. Vivian
 John Steppling as Stephen Schuyler
 Lila Leslie as 	Renee Etherington
 R.D. MacLean as Judge Ellicott
 William V. Mong as Jake Trebs 
 Tom Guise as James Valentine

References

Bibliography
 Goble, Alan. The Complete Index to Literary Sources in Film. Walter de Gruyter, 1999.
Wlaschin, Ken. Silent Mystery and Detective Movies: A Comprehensive Filmography. McFarland, 2009.

External links
 

1920 films
1920 thriller films
1920s English-language films
American silent feature films
American thriller films
American black-and-white films
Films directed by Ernest C. Warde
Films distributed by W. W. Hodkinson Corporation
Silent thriller films
1920s American films
Silent American drama films